The following is a timeline of the history of the city of Lima, Peru.

Prior to 19th century

 1535
 Ciudad de los Reyes founded by Francisco Pizarro.
 Cathedral of Lima construction begins.
 Plaza Mayor location designated.
 1541
 26 June: Francisco Pizarro assassinated.
 Catholic Diocese of Lima established.
 1542 – Spanish Real Audiencia established.
 1548 – Jerónimo de Loayza becomes Catholic Archbishop of Lima.
 1549 – Municipal Palace of Lima built.
 1551 – University of San Marcos founded.
 1555 - Artisan guilds established (approximate date).
 1565 –  (mint) established.
 1581 – Antonio Ricardo sets up printing press.
 1586 – 1586 Lima–Callao earthquake.
 1613 - Consulado (merchant guild) begins operating.
 1625 – Cathedral Basilica of Lima consecrated.
 1655 - 13 November: .
 1671
  (church) built.
 Rose of Lima canonized as a religious saint.
 1674 - Basilica and Convent of San Francisco completed.
 1687
 1687 Peru earthquake.
 Lima City Walls built.
 1700 – Population: 37,234.
 1746 – 1746 Lima–Callao earthquake.
 1768 – Plaza de toros de Acho (bullring) constructed.
 1791 – Population: 52,627.
 1799 – Callao-Lima highway constructed.

19th century
 1808 – Public cemetery established.
 1812 – Population: 63,900.
 1820 – Treasure of Lima reputedly removed from city.
 1821 - Lima taken by forces of José de San Martín; Peruvian independence from Spanish Empire declared.
 1822 - National Library of Peru founded.
 1828 – Earthquake.
 1838 – July: Political unrest.
 1839 – El Comercio newspaper begins publication.
 1854
 Medical Society founded.
 Yellow fever epidemic.
 1856 – Saint Cecilia Philharmonic Society formed.
 1860
 April: Earthquake.
 Lima Stock Exchange and Artisan Mutual Aid Society founded.
 1861 – Peru National Archive established.
 1865 - November: City taken by anti-Spanish forces during the Chincha Islands War.
 1867 - Fabrica de Chocolate Cavenago y Cortazar established.
 1868 – Club de la Union founded.
 1870 – Lima City Walls dismantled.
 1872 – Palacio de la Exposición built; Lima International Exhibition held.
 1876
 Escuela Especial de Construcciones Civiles y Minas established.
 Population: 101,488.
 1881 – Occupation of Lima by Chilean forces begins.
 1883 – Occupation of Lima by Chilean forces ends.
 1886
 Ateneo de Lima established.
 Teatro Olimpo (theatre) inaugurated.
 1888 –  founded.
 1897 – Estadio Guadalupe opens.
 1898 – Instituto Tecnico e Industrial del Peru inaugurated.

20th century

1900s-1940s
 1903 – Sociedad Empleados de Comercio organized.
 1906
 Museo de Historia Nacional opens.
 Lima Cricket and Football Club active.
 1907 – Lima Philharmonic Society founded.
 1908 - Population: 140,884.
 1914 – Teatro Colón (theatre) inaugurated.
 1918 - Museum of Natural History, Lima established.
 1923 – Museum of Italian Art inaugurated.
 1924 – Archbishop's Palace of Lima built.
 1928 - 21 July: Asociación Nacional de Periodistas del Perú founded in Lima.
 1929 – Teatro Municipal established.
 1933 -  (garden) established.
 1935 – Lima Municipal Library established.
 1936 – Cine Metro (cinema) opens.
 1938
 Government Palace built.
 National Symphony Orchestra founded.
 1939 – Legislative Palace built on Paseo Colón.
 1940 –  constructed.
 1944 – Municipal Palace of Lima rebuilt.

1950s-1990s
 1958 – Cine El Pacifico (cinema) in Miraflores built.
 1959
  (cemetery) established.
 Pastelería San Antonio in business.
 1961 - Population: 1,436,231 urban agglomeration.
 1962 – University of Lima founded.
 1964 - 24 May: Estadio Nacional disaster.
 1966 – 17 October: 1966 Peru earthquake.
 1969 - Perú Negro (musical group) formed.
 1972 - Population: 2,833,609 city; 3,302,523 urban agglomeration.
 1980 -  founded.
 1981 - City partnered with Austin, Texas, USA.
 1984 - Túpac Amaru Revolutionary Movement active.
 1988 – Historic Centre of Lima designated an UNESCO World Heritage Site.
 1990
 Lima Metro opens.
 Population: 6,414,500 (estimate).
 1991 – 3 November: Barrios Altos massacre.
 1992
 16 July: Tarata bombing.
 La Cantuta massacre.
 1996
 17 December: Japanese embassy hostage crisis begins.
 Alberto Andrade Carmona becomes mayor.
 1997 – Jockey Plaza shopping centre in Surco in business.
 1998 -  founded.
 1999 – Juan Luis Cipriani Thorne becomes Catholic Archbishop of Lima.

21st century

 2001 – Chocavento Tower built.
 2002 – 21 March: Bombing near U.S. embassy.
 2003 – Luis Castañeda Lossio becomes mayor.
 2004
 25 July: 2004 Copa América Final football tournament held.
 Camisea Gas Project begins operating.
 2005 -  headquartered in Lima.
 2007 – Population: 7,605,742; metro 8,472,935.
 2010 – El Metropolitano bus transit system begins operating.
 2011
 Lima Metro begins operating.
 Universidad de Ingeniería y Tecnología is founded.
 Susana Villarán becomes mayor.
 2013 - Air pollution in Lima reaches annual mean of 48 PM2.5 and 88 PM10, more than recommended.
 2015 - Luis Castañeda Lossio becomes mayor again.
 2016 - Population: 10,039,455.

See also
 History of Lima
 List of mayors of Lima
 Years in Peru

References

This article incorporates information from the Spanish Wikipedia.

Bibliography

in English
Published in the 18th-19th century
 
 
 
 
 
 
 
 
 
 

Published in the 20th century
 
 
 
 
 
 
 
 
 
 
 
 Dietz, Henry. Poverty and problem-solving under military rule: the urban poor in Lima, Peru. Austin : University of Texas Press, 1980. 
 

Published in the 21st century
 Ramón, Gabriel. "The script of urban surgery: Lima, 1850–1940". In Arturo Almandoz (ed.), Planning Latin America's capital cities, 1850–1950. New York: Routledge, 2002, pp. 170–192. 
 
 
 
 Walker, Charles. "The upper classes and their upper stories: architecture and the aftermath of the Lima earthquake of 1746". Hispanic American Historical Review 83 (1): 53–82 (February 2003).
 
 Higgins, James. Lima: a Cultural History. Oxford University Press, 2005.

in Spanish
 
 
 
 
  1904-1907 (4 volumes of titles published in Lima, arranged chronologically)

External links

 Items related to Lima, various dates (via Europeana)
 Items related to Lima, various dates (via Digital Public Library of America)

 
Lima
Years in Peru
Lima-related lists
Lima
Peru history-related lists